The spotted jelly (Mastigias papua), lagoon jelly, golden medusa, or Papuan jellyfish, is a species of jellyfish from the Indo-Pacific oceans. Like corals, sea anemones, and other sea jellies, it belongs to the phylum Cnidaria. Mastigias papua is one of the numerous marine animals living in symbiosis with zooxanthellae, a photosynthetic alga.

They have a lifespan of approximately 4 months and are active primarily in mid-summer to early autumn.

Taxonomy
Five subspecies have been described, inhabiting separate marine lakes in the Palau group.
M. cf. p. remengesaui (in Uet era Ongael)
M. cf. p. nakamurai (in Goby Lake)
M. cf. p. etpisoni (in Ongeim’l Tketau)
M. cf. p. saliii (in Clear Lake)
M. cf. p. remeliiki (in Uet era Ngermeuangel)

Description 

The spotted jelly is so named because of the little dots that garnish its jelly. Contrary to most medusozoans, Mastigias papua does not have stinging tentacles. However, some individuals may contain some rare cnidocytes spread on the arms of the animal but they are inoffensive because they have lost their stinging power.

Like all medusozoans, Mastigias papua is 95% composed of water. This water similar density enables it to easily float.

Alimentation 
Jellyfishes with stinging tentacles are usually hunters. Cnidocyte cells enable them to catch their preys before eating them. The spotted jelly has developed another way to feed itself; it lives in symbiosis with a unicellular photosynthetic organism called zooxanthellae. This unicellular organism settles in the tissue of jellyfishes. It provides products of photosynthesis to the jellyfish, and in return, the jellyfish provides it minerals and nutrients from the soil and the sea water.

In addition to this symbiosis, the spotted jelly has several small mouths used to grab animal plankton. These mouths are disposed all along its oral arms.

Habitat 
Spotted jellies have been recorded many times in the Indo-Pacific Ocean, between Japan and Australia. They live in shallow waters, and for this reason they are usually found in coastal and lagoonal waters, but also in marine lakes.

This species of jellyfish is well known for living in huge groups, forming aggregates (called "smacks"). This atypical behaviour becomes a tourist attraction. The most famous spot to admire these organisms is the Ongeim’l Tketau Lake in Palau. This lake has been formed 15,000 years ago. Like many other lakes of this region, it was initially joined to the Pacific Ocean, and because of geological movements, the lake has progressively become separated from the rest of the ocean. Mastigias papua has therefore been isolated in this closed lake, with other species of medusa. Out of reach of predators, it has progressively lost its cnidocyte cells, and is therefore now totally harmless to scuba divers. The lake of Palau now counts around 10 million individuals of this species.

Symbiosis with zooxanthellae 
The spotted jelly lives in trophic mutualism with a unicellular organism capable of photosynthesis: zooxanthella. This mutualism is based on a life cycle which permits an exchange of energy between the two species.

Mastigias papua has two different ways of life through 24 hours. During the day, it stays at the surface of the water, in the photic zone. The photic zone is located between the surface of the sea and approximately 100 meters deep. It corresponds to the zone where photosynthetic organisms can use sunlight as an energy source. The jelly swims almost 2 kilometres a day, following the sun, therefore allowing zooxanthellae living in its tissue to optimize their photosynthetic activity. Organic matter produced from this biochemical process is shared between the algae and its host. When the sun goes down, Mastigias papua gains deeper areas and zooxanthellae stop their photosynthetic activity. The jelly takes over the role of energy provider. It absorbs nutrients in the soil and stores them in its tissues. When the sun rises again, the jelly returns to the photic zone of and makes the absorbed nutrients available to the zooxanthellae.

Footnotes

External links 
 
 Mastigias papua at Animal Diversity Web
 Mastigias papua at Monterey Bay Aquarium
 

Mastigiidae
Articles containing video clips
Animals described in 1830